Milo Yosef (born 11 September 1998) is a German professional footballer who plays as a forward for FC Tulsa in the USL Championship.

College career 
Yosef played college soccer for Marshall University from 2019 until 2022. He made a total of 74 appearances and scored 27 goals, along with 18 assists over three seasons for the team. He was a part of the team that won the 2020 NCAA College Cup and won numerous accolades throughout his career, including being named an All-American and the 2022 Sun Belt Men's Soccer Player of the Year.

Club career

FC Tulsa 
On 3 January 2023 it was announced that FC Tulsa has signed Yosef in preparation of the 2023 USL Championship season. On March 11, 2023, Yosef started and scored in Tulsa's first match of the season, a 1 all draw against Miami FC.

Honors 
Marshall Thundering Herd
 Conference USA regular season: 2019, 2020
 Conference USA tournament champions: 2019
 United Soccer Coaches All-American: 2019, 2022
 NCAA National Championship: 2020

References

External links 

 Milo Yosef at Marshall Thundering Herd
 Milo Yosef at FC Tulsa

1998 births
Living people
Alemannia Aachen players
Association football forwards
Borussia Mönchengladbach players
Expatriate soccer players in the United States
Flint City Bucks players
German expatriate footballers
German expatriate sportspeople in the United States
Marshall Thundering Herd men's soccer players
FC Tulsa players
USL Championship players
USL League Two players